Isoceras is a genus of moths in the family Cossidae.

Species
 Isoceras bipunctatum (Staudinger, 1887)
 Isoceras huberi Eitschberger & Ströhle, 1987
 Isoceras kruegeri Turati, 1924
 Isoceras saxicola (Christoph, 1885)
 Isoceras teheranica Daniel, 1971

Former species
 Isoceras kaszabi Daniel, 1965

References

 , 1971: Österreichische Expeditionen nach Persien und Afghanistan. Beiträge zur Lepidopterenfauna, Teil 16 (3. Beitrag zur Bombyces- und Sphinges-Fauna). Annalen des Naturhistorische Museum in Wien 75: 651–660. Full article: .
 , 2004: Carpenter-Moths (Lepidoptera: Cossidae) of Mongolia. Euroasian Entomological Journal 3 (3): 217–224.

External links

Natural History Museum Lepidoptera generic names catalog

Cossinae
Moth genera